Sławków  is a town in Zagłębie Dąbrowskie (part of historic province of Lesser Poland), near Katowice. It borders the Upper Silesian Metropolitan Union – a metropolis with a population of around 2 million. Sławków is situated in the Silesian Voivodeship, previously it was in Katowice Voivodeship. The population of the town is 7,017 (2019). From 1999 to 2001, Sławków was part of Lesser Poland Voivodeship. When it was transferred to Silesian Voivodeship in 2002, it was assigned to Będzin County, despite being separated from the rest of that county by the cities of Dąbrowa Górnicza and Sosnowiec. It is the western terminus of the Broad Gauge Metallurgy Line.

Location
The town borders Dąbrowa Górnicza, Sosnowiec, Jaworzno and Bukowno. Apart from its historic center, Sławków has 25 smaller districts, and as much as 35% of the town is covered by forests. The name of the town comes from ancient Slavic given name Sławomir (Sławko, Sławek), and can be translated as The settlement of Sławko.

History
Archaeological sites from the Paleolithic and Neolithic ages have been discovered giving evidence to early human settlement in the area. The first written record of the town's name comes from 1220. However, the exact date of its incorporation remains unknown. Indirect written sources indicate that it most probably took place between 1279 and 1286. This assumption is supported by two documents from the 13th century: a charter issued in 1279 by Prince Bolesław V the Chaste, in which the locality is still called a village (villa episcopalis) and an agreement dated 1286 between the Bishop of Kraków Paweł z Przemankowa and Prince Leszek II the Black, in which Sławków is already called a town (civitas). In the 1280s, Bishop Paweł z Przemankowa built here a defensive castle, located near western border of Lesser Poland.

Due to rich deposits of lead and silver, and location on a merchant route from Kraków to Wrocław, Sławków quickly developed, and in the 13th century it was one of the most important urban centers of Lesser Poland. In the 14th century its importance diminished, and later on, the town was destroyed several times in numerous wars (1433, 1434, 1455), as well as in a fire (1498). Furthermore, the deposits of silver and lead dried out. Until the Partitions of Poland, Sławków remained administrative center of properties of the Bishop of Kraków.

In 1795 Sławków briefly belonged to New Silesia, and in 1806 was annexed by the Duchy of Warsaw (since 1815 Russian-controlled Congress Kingdom). In the mid-19th century first industrial enterprises were established here, and the town was connected with other locations in the area by a paved road. In 1870 Sławków lost its town privileges, to recover them in 1958. In 1885 it got a rail connection with Kielce and Dąbrowa Górnicza, in 1887 with Sosnowiec. In the Second Polish Republic Sławków belonged to Olkusz County, part of Kielce Voivodeship. After the war, until 1975, it belonged to Kraków Voivodeship, then was transferred to Katowice Voivodeship. Between 1977 and 1984, Sławków was a district of Dąbrowa Górnicza. At that time the town grew in size, due to the construction of Katowice Steelworks.

Points of interest
 Medieval center of the town, with a market square, and a town hall from 1905
 18th-century inn (austeria),
 St. Nicholas Church,
 complex of church parish (18th century),
 hospital for miners (1758),
 ruins of the castle of Bishops of Kraków (13th century, destroyed in 1455 and never rebuilt),
 Lamus – manor house of Bishops of Kraków (18th century)
 St. Jacob Church (1827)
 St. Rozalia wayside shrine (1536)

Demographics

Broad gauge railway
Linia Hutnicza Szerokotorowa (known by its acronym LHS, English: Broad gauge metallurgy line) in Sławków is the longest broad gauge railway line in Poland. Except for this one line, and a few very short stretches near border crossings, Poland uses the standard gauge for its railways, unlike Russia and the other former countries of the Soviet Union. The line runs on a single track for almost  from the Polish-Ukrainian border, crossing it just east of Hrubieszów, to Sławków. It is used only for freight transport, mainly iron ore and coal. It is the westernmost broad gauge railway line in Europe that is connected to the broad gauge rail system of the countries which before 1991 constituted the Soviet Union. The line is managed by PKP Linia Hutnicza Szerokotorowa Spólka z o.o. company. Previous name of this line was Linia Hutniczo-Siarkowa (English: Metallurgy – Sulphur Line), but after sulfur ceased to be transported on the line its name was changed.

Twin towns – sister cities

Sławków is twinned with:

 Horní Slavkov, Czech Republic
 Malý Slavkov, Slovakia
 Messeix, France
 Slavkov u Brna, Czech Republic

References

External links
 Jewish Community in Sławków on Virtual Shtetl
 Official Website Official city website

Cities and towns in Silesian Voivodeship
Będzin County
Kraków Voivodeship (14th century – 1795)
Kielce Governorate
Kielce Voivodeship (1919–1939)